Buddy Fruits is a squeezable fruit pouch sold in the US market, offering a range of ready-to-eat fruit snacks produced by Ouhlala Gourmet Corp. 
It was founded in 2008. The company's headquarters are in Miami, Florida.

The founders launched the first pure fruit pouch in 2009 with 5 flavors of Pure Blended Fruits. In the following years, Buddy Fruits also launched the first fruit smoothie in a pouch (Blended Fruits and Milk), the first fruit gel in a pouch (Pure Fruit Jiggle Gel), and the first larger pouches of Superfruits and of Cocomilk targeting adults.

Buddy Fruits offers a range of seven lines of products. They contain 100% fresh fruit, and are all natural with no preservatives, no artificial colors, and no additives.

Healthy innovations  

In 2012, Buddy Fruits launched two flavors of 100% baked Apple Chips. The baking process is a food cooking method using prolonged dry heat; on the other hand, the frying process, favored by most of the chips manufacturers, is the cooking of food in oil.
  
Buddy Fruits also launched the first fruit gel in a pouch. It was presented as a healthier vegan alternative to the traditional gelatin snacks because it has no water, no high-fructose corn syrup and no animal gelatin (Buddy Fruits uses fruit pectin instead).

Sport endorsement 

Buddy Fruits sponsors rising tennis player Christina McHale and double Olympic medalist Dee Dee Trotter.
Buddy Fruits is also involved in its local community and supports the Miami Hurricanes and the Miami Dolphins. Buddy Fruits was the Official Healthy Snack of the 2013 Sony Open Tennis in Miami, Florida.

Distribution 

Buddy Fruits provides its snack lines through a network of retail stores in the United States (Walmart, Safeway, Kroger, Publix), Canada, Europe, and in some countries in South America, Asia and the Middle-East. 
In the United States, Buddy Fruits’ products can also be found online.

See also

List of food companies

References

Further reading

External links
Buddy Fruits Official Site

Food and drink companies of the United States
Food and drink companies established in 2008
Food product brands
Companies based in Miami
2008 establishments in Florida